Jale Assembly constituency is an assembly constituency in Darbhanga district in the Indian state of Bihar.

Overview
As per Delimitation of Parliamentary and Assembly constituencies Order, 2008, No. 87 Jale Assembly constituency is composed of the following: Jale community development block; Asthua, Bhawanipur, Rajo, Katasa, Katka, Manikauli, Nista, Rampura, Sanahpur, Shakarpur, Singhwara North, Singhwara South, Jale South, Jale West, Jaale North, Jale East, katrual Basant, Rahi East, Radhi West, Rahi North, Radhi South, Doghra, Tariyani,  Reodha and Bharwara, Muraith  gram panchayats of Singhwara CD Block.

Jale Assembly constituency is part of No. 6 Madhubani (Lok Sabha constituency).

Members of Legislative Assembly

Election results

2020

2015

1977-2010
In the 2010 state assembly elections, Vijay Kumar Mishra of BJP won the Jale assembly seat, defeating his nearest rival Ramniwas Prasad of RJD. Contests in most years were multi cornered but only winners and runners are being mentioned. Ramniwas Prasad of RJD defeated Vijay Kumar Mishra of BJP in October 2005 and February 2005. Vijay Kumar Mishra of BJP in 2000. Abdul Salam of CPI defeated Vijay Kumar Mishra of Congress in 1995. Vijay Kumar Mishra of Congress defeated Abdul Salam of CPI in 1990. Lokesh Nath Jha of Congress defeated Abdul Salam of CPI in 1985. Abdul Salam of CPI defeated Sushil Kumar Jha of Congress in 1980. Kapildeo Thakur of JP defeated Khadim Hussain of CPI in 1977.

See also 

 Jalley

References

External links
 

 https://www.firstpost.com/politics/jale-election-result-2020-declared-bjp-sitting-mla-jibesh-kumar-wins-with-87321-votes-ex-amu-student-president-maskoor-usmani-loses-secures-65395-votes-8996741.html
 https://www.news18.com/news/india/jale-election-result-2020-live-updates-counting-of-votes-begin-3061877.html

Assembly constituencies of Bihar
Politics of Darbhanga district
Darbhanga district